Théhillac is a commune in the Morbihan department of Brittany in north-western France.

Demographics
Inhabitants of Théhillac are called in French Théhillacois. The population was 596 as of 2017, an increase of 16% compared with 1999.

See also
Communes of the Morbihan department

References

External links

Official website 

 Mayors of Morbihan Association 

Communes of Morbihan